Kyle Cassidy (born October 31, 1966) is an American photographer and videographer who lives in West Philadelphia. He holds a BA in English from Rowan University, and also holds an MCSE. He is the author of the book Armed America: Portraits of Gun Owners in Their Homes.

Contributions to photography 

Cassidy's "Photo-a-Week" project lets viewers into his life on a weekly basis starting on January 1, 2000.

His photographic style involves flights of fancy and a sense of humor. Laws of nature are applied inconsistently; people and objects are often levitating, and non sequiturs, whimsy, and cryptozoological intrusions are common. "I think the world in my photographs is a lot darker in many ways than the real world that people insulate themselves in, but it's also a lot funnier. My world is malevolent but humorous, as opposed to the real world which is malevolent and relentless, but is often packaged in a friendly box and rabbit ears," he said in a 2004 interview with A.D. Amorosi in the October issue of Art Matters. His images often explore themes of "truth" and "fiction". This culminated in his July 2006 show "Lies" at the Sol gallery in Philadelphia. "Photography," he says in the artist's statement for that show "is about lies just as much as it is about the truth."

His work with cutters and homeless orphans presaged his 2004 fascination with American gun owners which led to the book, Armed America: Portraits of Gun Owners in Their Homes, which provided a view into the lives of a controversial culture, praised by advocates of both gun control and gun ownership. It was named by Amazon as both one of the ten best art books of 2007, and as one of the 100 best books of 2007.

Cassidy's approach to shooting portraits has resulted in book covers and album art. His portraits are often shot in context, but in the early days of Occupy Wall Street he set up mini-portrait studios at both the NYC and Philly protests, to remove the context and focus on the individuality of the people attending. The photos were published at The Huffington Post.  He hung a show of the Occupy shots at the Bluestocking Gallery in Manhattan. In another project, he took photographs of the scientists responsible for the discoveries of the New Horizons probe.

In 2012, Cassidy released War Paint: Tattoo Culture & the Armed Forces, a book of photographs and interviews with tattooed veteran soldiers.

In 2013, he became involved with the North Dakota Man Camp Project, a project to document the lives of oil workers in the area around the Bakken formation. Photos from the project appeared in a Slate.com photo essay and the open access edited collection The Bakken Goes Boom: Oil and the Changing Geographies of Western North Dakota, published by The Digital Press at the University of North Dakota.

In October 2013, his poster and photo for the Curio Theatre Company's production of Romeo and Juliet led to an interview published in The New York Times.

In 2014, Cassidy's photo essay, "This Is What a Librarian Looks Like", based on photographs taken at an American Library Association event, was published on Slate.com. He continued to photograph librarians and libraries in the following years, culminating in the publication of a 2017 photobook, This Is What a Librarian Looks Like: A Celebration of Libraries, Communities, and Access to Information.

Contributions to technology 
In 1993 Cassidy wrote SATURN: A Beginners Guide to Using the Internet, followed by Stickman's Way Cool Guide to Network Wizardry. Cassidy published two additional technology books, The Concise Guide to Enterprise Internetworking and Security and Introduction to Windows 2000 Network Administration. He co-wrote the paper "Can You Trust Your Email?" in 1993, warning of a flaw in the protocol used to deliver email, which could allow information to be forged.

Published work 
He has written books on information technology, as well as working as contributing editor for Videomaker Magazine. His work has appeared in The New York Times, Barron's Magazine, Photographers Forum, The Huffington Post, Asleep by Dawn, Gothic Beauty and numerous other
publications.

His works include:
Cassidy, Kyle (2017). This Is What a Librarian Looks Like: A Celebration of Libraries, Communities, and Access to Information. New York: Hachette Book Group.

References

External links 

Interstitiality within Photography: an interview with Kyle Cassidy, interstitialarts.org; accessed June 11, 2017.
"Kyle Cassidy: The Unpredictable Eye: Part 1". The Leica Camera Blog (January 21, 2011).
"Kyle Cassidy: The Unpredictable Eye: Part 2". The Leica Camera Blog (February 5, 2011).

Living people
American photographers
Photographers from Philadelphia
People from Woodbury, New Jersey
Rowan University alumni
1966 births